East Berkshire United Methodist Church is a historic United Methodist church located at Berkshire in Tioga County, New York.  It was built in 1888 and is a simple, one story frame building with a steep standing seam metal roof and clapboard siding.  A small, square based louvered belfry is mounted directly above the gabled facade.

It was listed on the National Register of Historic Places in 1984.

References

Churches on the National Register of Historic Places in New York (state)
United Methodist churches in New York (state)
Churches completed in 1889
19th-century Methodist church buildings in the United States
Churches in Tioga County, New York
National Register of Historic Places in Tioga County, New York